Dune: The Lady of Caladan is a 2021 science fiction novel by Brian Herbert and Kevin J. Anderson, set in the Dune universe created by Frank Herbert. It is the second book in the Caladan Trilogy of prequels. The novel was released on September 21, 2021 by Tor Books. It was preceded by Dune: The Duke of Caladan in October 2020, and will be followed by the forthcoming Dune: The Heir of Caladan in October 2022.

Reception
Ryan Britt of Den of Geek wrote, "When Dune begins, this matter has more or less been settled, but how? Dune: The Lady of Caladan, a new prequel novel in the Dune series, answers that question and then some. The latest in a long line of Dune prequel and sequel novels from Brian Herbert and Kevin J. Anderson, The Lady of Caladan tells the story of Jessica’s tribulations and adventures in the year before the original book begins. And, in doing so, The Lady of Caladan enriches the entire saga. If, after re-reading Frank Herbert’s Dune, or, in anticipation of the new film, you want to get a greater sense of Lady Jessica, this book delivers. Here’s how The Lady of Caladan fits into the Dune timeline, and why it’s a fantastic way of reframing the larger story." Jordan Maison of Cinelinx stated, "Even though The Lady of Caladan brings to mind some familiar problems, I find myself greatly enjoying this new trilogy. I especially had fun with this one. There’s plenty of action, intrigued [sic], and all those elements you’ve come to expect from the franchise. The middle novel does an excellent job of wrapping up earlier storylines, while introducing some others I’m eager to see payoff when the final book arrives next year."

References

External links

2021 American novels
2021 science fiction novels
Dune (franchise) novels
Novels by Kevin J. Anderson
Novels by Brian Herbert
Tor Books books
Prequel novels